Sar Cheshmeh-ye Kuganak (also Romanized as Sar Cheshmeh-ye Kūgānak; also known as Sar Cheshmeh) is a village in Chenarud-e Jonubi Rural District, Chenarud District, Chadegan County, Isfahan Province, Iran. At the 2006 census, its population was 126, with 21 families.

References 

Populated places in Chadegan County